Miss Gibraltar is a national beauty pageant in Gibraltar.

History
The first Miss Gibraltar pageant was held in 1959, however, it did not resume until 1964. The winner represents her nation at Miss World annually.

Miss Universe
The winners of Miss Gibraltar competed at Miss Universe from 1981 to 1990. In 1984 Jessica Palao awarded Congeniality award at Miss Universe 1984 at James L. Knight Center, Miami, Florida, United States.

Miss World
The 59th Miss World pageant was held on 12 December 2009 at the Gallagher Convention Centre in Johannesburg, South Africa. 112 contestants from all over the world competed for the crown, marking the biggest turnout in the pageant's history. Gibraltar's Kaiane Aldorino, aged 23, was crowned Miss World 2009. Kaiane won Miss World Beach Beauty en route to the top prize sparking off mass celebrations in Gibraltar as the population watched the event unfold live on television.

Kaiane was flown to Gibraltar from London on a private jet on 17 December where she was greeted at Gibraltar Airport by Government, family and friends. From there, Kaiane was paraded down Main Street in an open-top car (the same one used by Charles and Diana when they visited Gibraltar to embark the Royal Yacht Britannia to start their honeymoon cruise) preceded by the band of the Royal Gibraltar Regiment and then appeared at the City Hall balcony. The celebrations culminated with a fireworks display from Gibraltar Harbour. 

As a tribute to Kaiane Aldorino, the Gibraltar Philatelic Bureau issued a special sheet of stamps.

Miss International
Began 2012 a 1st Runner-up represents Gibraltar at Miss International. Jamielee Randall, a runner-up in 2013 placed as Top 15 at Miss International 2013 in Tokyo, Japan.

Titleholders

References

External links
Miss Gibraltar Official site

Gibraltar
Gibraltar
Beauty pageants in Gibraltar
Organisations based in Gibraltar
Recurring events established in 1959
1959 establishments in Gibraltar
Annual events in Gibraltar
Gibraltarian awards